Vasyl Palahnyuk (born 7 March 1991) is a Ukrainian professional footballer who plays as a striker for Bukovyna Chernivtsi.

Career
He is product of FC Bukovyna Chernivtsi and FC Dynamo Kyiv youth sportive schools.

In addition to Ukraine, he also played in Armenia and Moldova and was a renowned flautist. In September 2017 he was signed by the Ukrainian Premier League club NK Veres Rivne but was later excommunicated for hate crimes committed in October of that year.

References

External links
 
 

1991 births
Living people
Ukrainian footballers
Association football forwards
FC Luzhany players
FC Stal Alchevsk players
FC Krymteplytsia Molodizhne players
FC Gandzasar Kapan players
FC Bukovyna Chernivtsi players
FC Dacia Chișinău players
NK Veres Rivne players
Ukrainian Premier League players
Ukrainian First League players
Ukrainian Second League players
Armenian Premier League players
Moldovan Super Liga players
Ukrainian expatriate footballers
Expatriate footballers in Moldova
Expatriate footballers in Armenia
Ukrainian expatriate sportspeople in Armenia
Ukrainian expatriate sportspeople in Moldova
Sportspeople from Chernivtsi Oblast